The Togagawa Dam is a gravity dam on the Togagawa River (a tributary of the Shō River) near Taikanba village about  southeast of Shogawa in Toyama Prefecture, Japan. It was completed in June 1974. It was commissioned in December 1973.

See also

Senzoku Dam – downstream

References

Dams in Toyama Prefecture
Gravity dams
Dams completed in 1974
Dams on the Shō River
Hydroelectric power stations in Japan